The great shortwing (Heinrichia calligyna) is a species of bird in the family Muscicapidae, and the only member of its genus. Other common names include giant shortwing, Celebes shortwing and Sulawesi shortwing. It is endemic to Sulawesi in Indonesia where its natural habitat is tropical moist montane forests.

Description
In general size and shape it resembles a European robin (Erithacus rubecula). The male is almost entirely very dark blue apart from a small patch of white at either side of the base of the tail. The female is a similar blue colour but has a white spot in front of the eye and a reddish-brown rump. It has a reddish-brown sheen to the throat and upper breast, and greyish-blue underparts. Both sexes have red irises, black beaks and greyish legs.

Distribution
Three subspecies are recognised. H. c. simplex from northern Sulawesi, H. c. calligyna from south-central Sulawesi, and H. c. picta from southeastern Sulawesi.

Ecology
The great shortwing is a shy and secretive bird which lurks in dense foliage, tangled thickets, vines, deep gullies and streamside vegetation. It can sometimes be heard singing in the early morning from dense cover, often with two birds singing in duet. The song is a high-pitched, wavering series of whistles that increase in pitch and volume, the phrase being repeated, over and over again, for up to a minute. The bird feeds on the ground, foraging through the leaf litter, mosses and lichens, presumably feeding on insects, grubs and other small invertebrates. The nesting habits are unknown, but a juvenile was observed in Lore Lindu National Park in September 2016.

Status
Little is known of the conservation status of the great shortwing but the bird is suspected of declining in numbers because of the destruction of its habitat and the introduction of feral predators. It is an uncommon species in the lower part of its range but rather more common in the upper part. The International Union for Conservation of Nature has assessed its conservation status as being of "least concern".

References

Heinrichia
Endemic birds of Sulawesi
Birds described in 1931
Taxonomy articles created by Polbot